Heliophorus sena, the sorrel sapphire, is a small butterfly found in India that belongs to the lycaenids or blues family.

See also
List of butterflies of India
List of butterflies of India (Lycaenidae)

References
 
  
 
 
 
 

Heliophorus
Butterflies of Asia
Butterflies described in 1844